Yarskoy 2-y is a rural locality (a khutor) in Krasnyanskoye Rural Settlement, Kumylzhensky District, Volgograd Oblast, Russia. The population was 35 as of 2010.

Geography 
Yarskoy 2-y is located between Don and Medveditsa Rivers, 62 km south of Kumylzhenskaya (the district's administrative centre) by road. Buyerak-Popovsky is the nearest rural locality.

References 

Rural localities in Kumylzhensky District